Jonesboro Historic District in Jonesboro, Georgia is a historic district that was listed on the National Register of Historic Places (NRHP) in 1972.

Jonesboro was the setting of much of the 1936 novel Gone with the Wind; the fictional houses Tara and Twelve Oaks were placed near it, in Clayton County.

It includes Stately Oaks, also separately listed on the NRHP, which is believed to be the inspiration for Tara.

It includes the Clayton County Courthouse.

References

Historic districts on the National Register of Historic Places in Georgia (U.S. state)
Gothic Revival architecture in Georgia (U.S. state)
Geography of Clayton County, Georgia
National Register of Historic Places in Clayton County, Georgia